José Manuel Kindelán Duany (8 October 1887 – 9 November 1919) was a Spanish referee and footballer who played as a defender for RCD Espanyol and Sociedad Gimnástica.

Playing career
Born in Cádiz, he moved to Madrid as a child, and enventually joined Club Español de Madrid in 1908, helping the club win its first piece of silverware, the 1908–09 Centro Championship, and then reached the 1909 Copa del Rey Final, which they lost 1-3 to Club Ciclista. His great campaign with Español earned him a move to Sociedad Gimnástica in 1909, featuring alongside the likes of José Carruana and Sócrates Quintana. Kindelán once again played an important role in the first piece of silverware of a club, this time contributing to Gimnástica winning the 1909–10 Centro Championship, and again in 1910–11 and 1913–14. In 1912, he helped Gimnástica reach which still remains the only Copa del Rey final in the club's history, which they lost 0–2 to FC Barcelona. Kindelán remained loyal to the club until 1915, when he left for Athletic Madrid, with whom he played for just one year before retiring at the end of the 1915–16 season.

Refereeing career
Kindelán began his refereeing career when he was still an active player, which was normal at the time. In 1914, he was among those who formed the College of Referees of the Central Regional Federation, which was the first College of Referees in Spain. Together with the likes of Manuel Prast, Alfonso Albéniz and Julián Ruete, he was a member of the College's first constitution on 15 April 1914. However, he resigned from the position just a few weeks later, on 9 May, to become one of the first category referees, and whose most important task was to referee the matches of the Central Championship, and if available, the Copa del Rey.

Honours

Club
Club Español de Madrid
Centro Championship:
Champions (1): 1908–09

Copa del Rey:
Runner-up (1): 1909

-

RS Gimnástica
Centro Championship:
Champions (3): 1909–10, 1910–11 and 1913–14

Copa del Rey:
Runner-up (1): 1912

References

1887 births
1919 deaths
Footballers from Madrid
Footballers from Cádiz
Spanish footballers
Association football defenders
Atlético Madrid footballers